The  are Japanese mystery novels by Kouhei Kadono. Kadono began his career writing light novels, but this series came from a mainstream publishing label, Kodansha Novels. In 2008 Del Rey Manga  announced that they would be publishing the first novel in the series in English, but did not release any.

Novels 
 , June 2000, 
 When a dragon is murdered, the main characters must travel the globe, trying to discover how such a thing was even possible.
 , June 2001, 
 During a sorcery tournament, sorcerers begin dying in unusual ways.
 , December 2002, 
 A princess is found encased in crystal, and the main suspect flees to an island ruled by pirates
 , January 2005, 
 In the aftermath of destruction, investigators ponder links between unsolved mysteries from a town's past.
 , March 2009, 
 , January 2016, 
 Beyond The Dragon's Skies

References 

Japanese serial novels
Mystery novels by series
Novels by Kouhei Kadono
2000 Japanese novels
Japanese mystery novels